Mauricio Oliva Herrera (born 8 March 1951 in Tegucigalpa) is a Honduran surgeon and politician. He served as deputy of the National Congress of Honduras representing the National Party of Honduras for Choluteca and as the President of the National Congress of Honduras.

In 2021, he was a candidate in the National Party primary for the presidential election. He was considered the candidate closest to President Hernández. He lost the primary to Nasry Asfura.

References

External links

1951 births
Living people
People from Tegucigalpa
National Party of Honduras politicians
Presidents of the National Congress of Honduras
Honduran surgeons